Leon De Meyere (died 28 December 1630) was a poet from Antwerp about whom very little is known.

Life and writing
His earliest known work, which identifies him as a licentiate of laws, was a poem in French celebrating the reception of Archduke Ernest of Austria as governor general of the Habsburg Netherlands in 1594, Prosopopée d'Anvers à la bienvenue du Sérénissime prince Ernest. Four years later, at the reception of Albert and Isabella as rulers of the Habsburg Netherlands, he brought out Poëme. Advis pour la paix de Belgique (1598), a policy paper in verse. This was a controversial piece that elicited an unfavourable Responce au Poeme d'advis pour la paix Belgique (1598).

In 1599 De Meyere was appointed provost of the church of St Pharaildis in Ghent. During his time in Ghent he became friendly with local poet Maximiliaan de Vriendt and published two Latin orations on Marian themes, one for the Feast of the Annunciation and one for the Assumption. In 1615 he transferred to the collegiate church in Harelbeke, where he remained until his death.

Works
 Prosopopée d'Anvers à la bienvenue du Sérénissime prince Ernest par la grâce de Dieu archiduc d'Autriche, etc., lieutenant gouverneur et capitaine général des Pays-Bas (Antwerp, Arnout Coninx, 1594).
 Poëme. Advis pour la paix de Belgique (Antwerp, Arnout Coninx, 1598).
 Panegyris Mariana, in festo Annunciationis (Antwerp, Plantin office, 1602).
 Panegyricus Mariae virgini triumphanti, die assumptioni sacro (Antwerp, Hieronymus Verdussen, 1613).

References
 J. Roulez, "De Meyere (Leon)", Biographie Nationale de Belgique, vol. 5 (Brussels, 1876), 561–563.

Roman Catholic priests of the Habsburg Netherlands
Poets of the Habsburg Netherlands
17th-century poets
1630 deaths
Year of birth unknown
Poets of the Spanish Netherlands
17th-century male writers
Clergy of the Spanish Netherlands